Face to Face is an album by pianist Tete Montoliu and bassist Niels-Henning Ørsted Pedersen recorded in 1982 and released on the Danish label, SteepleChase.

Track listing
 "There Will Never Be Another You" (Harry Warren, Mack Gordon) – 10:34	
 "I Love You" (Cole Porter) – 9:20
 "I Fall in Love Too Easily" (Jule Styne, Sammy Cahn) – 11:02	
 "Lover Man/Salt Peanuts" (Jimmy Davis, Roger "Ram" Ramirez, James Sherman/Dizzy Gillespie) – 9:34

Personnel
Tete Montoliu – piano
Niels-Henning Ørsted Pedersen – bass

References

Tete Montoliu albums
Niels-Henning Ørsted Pedersen albums
1982 albums
SteepleChase Records albums